Muhammad Sheeraz (born 18 July 1956) is a Pakistani politician hailing from Topi, Swabi District, who served a member of the Khyber Pakhtunkhwa Assembly and he belongs to the Pakistan Muslim League (N). He is also serving as a member of different committees.

Political career
Sheeraz was elected as the member of the Khyber Pakhtunkhwa Assembly on the ticket of Pakistan Muslim League (N) from PK-36 (Swabi-VI) in  the 2013 Pakistani general election.

References

1956 births
Living people
Pakistan Muslim League (N) politicians
People from Swabi District
Khyber Pakhtunkhwa MPAs 2013–2018